John Geddes (1735–1799) was a Scottish Roman Catholic bishop who served as rector of the Royal Scots College, Valladolid, from 1771 to 1780, and as the Coadjutor Vicar Apostolic of the Lowland District of Scotland from 1779 to 1797.

Life
Born at Mains of Corridoun, Enzie, Banffshire on 9 September 1735, he entered the Scots College, Rome on 6 February 1750, and took the oath on 31 July 1750. He received the tonsure on 27 March 1754 and the four minor orders from Cardinal Spinelli on 31 March 1754. He was ordained a subdeacon by Monsignor de Rossi on 4 March 1759, a deacon by Monsignor Mattei on 10 March 1759, and a priest by Cardinal Spinelli on 18 March 1759. He left Rome for the mission in Scotland on 19 April 1759, and served as the Rector of Scalan College from 1762 to 1767.

In 1771, Fr. Geddes spearheaded a revival of the former Royal Scots College at Madrid, which had been dormant since 1734. Geddes and fifteen seminarians, including seven native speakers of the Scottish Gaelic language from Lochaber and South Uist, revived the college on the outskirts of Valladolid, in Northern Spain. The future Bishop later became the College's first post-1734 Rector and has since been credited with being solely responsible for the Royal Scots College's continued survival.

He was elected the Coadjutor Vicar Apostolic of the Lowland District by the Sacred Congregation for the Propagation of the Faith on 13 September 1779, which was approved by Pope Pius VI on 19 September 1779, and expedited on 29 September 1779. His papal brief to the titular see of Marocco o Marruecos was dated on 30 September 1779 and was consecrated at Madrid on 30 November 1779 (St. Andrew's Day) by Francisco Antonio de Lorenzana y Butrón, Archbishop of Toledo, assisted by Francisco Mateo Aguiriano Gómez and Felipe Pérez Santa María, auxiliary bishops of Toledo.

Following his consecration, Bishop Geddes became a very well-known figure during the Scottish Enlightenment in Edinburgh. When Scottish national poet Robert Burns, who gave the Bishop the volume now known as The Geddes Burns, wrote to a correspondent that "the first [that is, finest] cleric character I ever saw was a Roman Catholick", Burns was referring to Bishop John Geddes.

Bishop Geddes resigned the coadjutorship of the Lowland District on 26 October 1797, and died at Aberdeen on 11 February 1799, aged 63. He is buried in the same grave with Bishop James Grant in the ruins of the Snow Kirk in Old Aberdeen.

References

Further reading

 

1735 births
1799 deaths
18th-century Roman Catholic bishops in Scotland
18th-century Roman Catholic titular bishops
Apostolic vicars of Scotland
History of Catholicism in Scotland
People from Banffshire
People of the Scottish Enlightenment
Robert Burns
Roman Catholic missionaries in Scotland